Assumption College Samutprakarn (formerly Assumption College Samrong ) is a private Catholic school in Samut Prakan Province, Thailand. The school was founded and run by the Brothers of St. Gabriel since 1979 as the thirteenth educational institution of the congregation. The school provides education to students from grade 1 through 12.

History 
Assumption College Samrong established on October 12, 1978. Vichai Maleenont, the founder of BEC World and was the director of Theparak Estate Co., Ltd. at the time donated 23,708 sqm. including 3,000,000 Thai Baht in cash to the Brothers of St. Gabriel for the purpose of establish Assumption College Samrong which was named after the district it was located at the time.

The school opened on May 17, 1979. In its first academic year, it offered classes from grade 1 through 12, consisting 8 classrooms, 15 teachers and 371 students. It was supervised by Bro. Viriya Chandavarodom.

Assumption College Samrong changed its name to Assumption College Samutprakarn in 2003 after the Ministry of the Interior changed the district of administration. This made the school no longer located in Samrong district. The school changed its name again to Assumption College Samutprakarn in 2008.

Assumption College Samutprakarn received the Royal Award Granted Secondary School in academic year 2007 and the Royal Award Granted Primary School in academic year 2012 awarded by the Office of the Basic Education Commission.

Assumption College Samutprakarn started its English program in 2006. It firstly offered classes only in grade 1, 4 and 7. The classes grew every year and finally filled all of the 12 levels in 2012.

Buildings

Assumption building
Assumption building is the first building built in 1978. It was finished in half of the full plan at the time they opened in 1979 for its first academic semester. It was blessed by Cardinal Michael Michai Kitbunchu (then a regular Archbishop, pre-elevation to the cardinalate) and inaugurated by Sanya Dharmasakti, president of the Privy Council on August 25, 1979. The building was completed as planned in 1981.

Single storey-building
Single storey-building built in 1982. It was constructed with 6 classrooms. It was demolished in 2008 to make way for the new building.

St. Gabriel building
St. Gabriel building built in 1984 as a 5 storey-building. At the time, it consists of 7 classrooms on each floor. It was blessed and inaugurated on July 6, 1985. It was used by the students from grade 1 through 3 until the new building was finished in 2008. Later on, It was used by the school's English Program 
as an intensive classroom.

Montfort building
Monfort building built in 1988. It consists of 7 storey including 7 classrooms on each floor.

Administrative building
Administrative building was built simultaneously with Montfort building in 1988. It contains general offices of the school. The construction was completed in 1990. Both Administrative and Montfort building was blessed by Cardinal Michael Michai Kitbunchu and inaugurated by Princess Soamsawali, the senior consort and former wife of King Maha Vajiralongkorn.

Louis Marie building
Louis Marie building is a 4 storey-building completed in 1999. Its first and second floor used as a canteen. The third and fourth floor used as convention hall until 2006 when the third floor was remodelled for activities used and laboratories.

Louis Chanel building
Louis Chanel building is a 6 storey-building completed in 2007. It used for students from grade 1 through 3 who moved from St. Gabriel building and grade 4 from Montfort building. The building was blessed by Cardinal Michael Michai Kitbunchu and inaugurated by Princess Maha Chakri Sirindhorn.

Sport Center
Sport Center is a semi indoor arena used for sport activities. It consists of 2 basketball court and futsal field with grandstands.

Sakdanusorn building
Sakdanusorn building is a sport activities building completed in 2015. The building consists of 2 swimming pools, a fitness centre and physical education facilities. The building named after its former director, Bro. Sakda Kitcharoen, who died in 2010. Both swimming pools and fitness centre are open for public use after school time.

Saint Louis Arena 
Saint Louis Arena is a multipurpose yard and have a Football Field.

School Directors

Notable alumni 
Entertainment
 Apichet Kittikorncharoen (Big D2B) - Singer 
 Kawee Tanjararak (Beam) - Singer of D2B
 Chotiwuth Boonyasith (Nut) - Guitarist of Singular
 Nannaphas Loetnamchoetsakun - Netflix actress
Sport
Sarach Yooyen - football player of Thailand national football team

See also 
Brothers of St. Gabriel

References

External links 
Assumption College Samutprakarn official website

Catholic schools in Thailand
Educational institutions established in 1979
Brothers of Christian Instruction of St Gabriel schools
Private schools in Thailand
1979 establishments in Thailand
Education in Samutprakan province